Heman may refer to

 Heman the Ezrahite, the author of Psalm 88 in the Hebrew Bible
 Heman (given name), a male given name
 Heman, an unincorporated community in Illinois
 He-Man, a character from the Masters of the Universe media franchise

See also
He-Man (disambiguation)